Anna Sorokin (born January 23, 1991), also known as Anna Delvey, is a con artist and fraudster who posed as a wealthy heiress to access the upper echelons of the New York social and art scenes from 2013 to 2017.

Born to working-class parents in the Soviet Union (now Russia), Sorokin emigrated from Russia to Germany with her family at the age of sixteen in 2007. In 2011, she left Germany to live in London and Paris before relocating to New York City in 2013, where she interned for the French fashion magazine Purple. Sorokin conceived of a private members' club and arts foundation, which included leasing a large building to feature pop-up shops and exhibitions by notable artists she met while interning. She later created fake financial documents to substantiate her claims of having a multimillion-euro trust fund, and forged multiple wire transfer confirmations. Sorokin used these documents, as well as fraudulent checks, to trick banks, acquaintances, and realtors into paying out cash and granting large loans without collateral. She used this to fund her lavish lifestyle, including residencies in multiple upscale hotels. Between 2013 and 2017, Sorokin defrauded and deceived major financial institutions, banks, hotels, and individuals for a total of $275,000.

In 2017, the NYPD arrested Sorokin in a sting operation with the help of her former friend, Rachel DeLoache Williams, who accused Sorokin of defrauding her of $62,000. In 2019, Sorokin was convicted in a New York state court of attempted grand larceny, larceny in the second degree, and theft of services, and was sentenced to 4 to 12 years in prison. After serving two years, she was remanded into the custody of U.S. Immigration and Customs Enforcement for deportation to Germany. On 5 October 2022, Sorokin was granted a $10,000 bail bond and released from prison. As of October 2022, Sorokin is required to remain in a 24-hour home confinement with electronic monitoring and no access to social media.

Sorokin's story gained publicity when Williams wrote a lengthy article in Vanity Fair about her experiences with Sorokin in 2018. She expanded on the story in her 2019 book My Friend Anna. The same year, journalist Jessica Pressler wrote an article for New York about Sorokin's life as a socialite; Netflix paid Sorokin $320,000 for the rights to her story and developed it into the 2022 miniseries Inventing Anna. Sorokin's life story has been the subject of multiple other television shows, interviews, podcasts, and theater productions.

Early life

Sorokin was born on January 23, 1991, in Domodedovo, a working-class satellite town south of Moscow, Russian Federal Republic in the Soviet Union. Her father, Vadim, worked as a truck driver while her mother owned a small convenience store. In 2007, when Sorokin was 16, her family relocated to North Rhine-Westphalia, Germany. There, her father became an executive at a transport company until the company became insolvent in 2013. He then opened an HVAC business specializing in efficient energy use. Sorokin's mother was a housewife. Sorokin attended the Bischöfliche Liebfrauenschule Eschweiler (Episcopal School of Our Lady of Eschweiler), a Catholic grammar school in Eschweiler. Peers said she was quiet and struggled with the German language. As a young adult, Sorokin obsessively followed Vogue, fashion blogs, and image accounts on LiveJournal and Flickr.

After graduating from the school in June 2011, Sorokin moved to London to attend Central Saint Martins, an art school, but soon dropped out and returned to Germany. In 2012, she briefly interned at a public relations company in Berlin. Sorokin then relocated to Paris, where she earned around €400 per month through an internship for Purple, a French fashion magazine. Although Sorokin did not contact her parents often, they subsidized her rent. Around that time, Sorokin began using the name "Anna Delvey", which she claimed was based on her mother's maiden name. Sorokin's parents, however, said they "do not recognize the surname". Sorokin later admitted she "just came up with it."

Fraud
In mid-2013, Sorokin traveled to New York City to attend New York Fashion Week. Finding it easier to make friends in New York than Paris, she opted to stay, transferring to Purples New York office for a brief time. After quitting Purple, Sorokin came up with the idea of the "Anna Delvey Foundation" – a private members' club and art foundation – and unsuccessfully sought funding from wealthy members of the city's social scene. She received planning help from the son of architect Santiago Calatrava. She also discussed the sale of drinks at the venue with Roo Rogers.

DJ Elle Dee described a strange encounter with Sorokin at a party in May 2014 in Montauk, New York, where Sorokin pretended to be a wealthy heiress and bragged about the brands of clothes she was wearing, but also asked partygoers for a place to sleep. When they declined, she spent the night sleeping in a car. Dee also described the other attendees at a party she attended that was organized by Sorokin at the The Standard, High Line: "she barely knew them - as if it was maybe the second time they'd ever met, kind of like us. Everyone just sat around, quietly staring at their own phones." Dee described Sorokin as "entitled and mean – especially to people in the service industry". She castigated people who did not have many followers on Instagram and bragged about how she was going to rent a $12,000-per-month, six-bedroom rooftop apartment. Dee also said that Sorokin relied on her and other acquaintances to pay for her expenses, by claiming she had forgotten her wallet or that it was an emergency and her credit cards did not work, shedding crocodile tears that dried up quickly when she realized the scheme would not work.

In 2015, Sorokin met art collector and University of Pennsylvania student Michael Xufu Huang at a dinner party. Learning that Huang planned to attend the Venice Biennale, Sorokin asked him if she could accompany him. Huang agreed and booked a flight and hotel room for Sorokin on the understanding that he would be reimbursed for the $2,000–$3,000 cost. On their return to New York, Sorokin appeared to "forget" the arrangement and failed to pay. Huang initially assumed that Sorokin was simply absent-minded. Also in 2015, Sorokin attended Art Basel in Miami Beach. Sorokin hired a public relations firm to book a birthday party for herself at Sadelle's restaurant in January 2016; after her credit card was declined and pictures of Huang at the event were posted on social media, Huang was asked by restaurant staff if he had Sorokin's contact details. At this time Huang became suspicious of Sorokin, also noticing that she strangely always paid with cash and lived in a hotel, not an apartment. He was eventually repaid but from a Venmo account by an unfamiliar name. He then blocked Sorokin's access to him on social media, ending their friendship.

In February 2016, while Sorokin was living in a hotel room in The Standard, High Line, she met Rachel DeLoache Williams, then a photo editor at Vanity Fair, at a nightclub. Williams described Sorokin as "demanding and rude to waitstaff" and said that "when an elevator opened, she wouldn't wait for other people to get off". Nevertheless, Williams became close friends with Sorokin and was later instrumental in her arrest.

Sorokin used Microsoft Word to create fake bank statements and other financial documents purporting to show that she had €60 million in Swiss bank accounts but could not access them since they were in trust and she was in the U.S. One of Sorokin's acquaintances put her in touch with lawyer Andrew Lance at Gibson Dunn, who in turn put her in touch with several large financial institutions, including City National Bank and Fortress Investment Group. In November 2016, Sorokin submitted false documents as part of a loan application for $22 million to City National. City National refused to extend credit when Sorokin failed to provide the source of the Swiss assets, and she then applied for a loan from Fortress. Fortress agreed to consider the application if Sorokin paid $100,000 to cover legal expenses relating to the application. In December 2016, with Sorokin unable to pay rent, the Church Missions House was instead leased to Fotografiska New York.

On January 12, 2017, Sorokin convinced City National to grant her a temporary overdraft facility for $100,000, on the promise that it would be repaid promptly. Sorokin provided fake AOL email addresses of "Peter Hennecke", a non-existent business manager; when suspicions arose, Sorokin claimed that he died, and then invented a new persona, "Bettina Wagner". Prosecutors in her trial later showed that she had used Google to query "create fake untraceable email". Sorokin remitted the $100,000 to Fortress for the loan application but a managing director at Fortress became suspicious of Sorokin's application due to discrepancies in her paperwork – for example, she claimed to be of German heritage, but her passport revealed that she was born in Russia. When the director arranged to verify Sorokin's assets by meeting her bankers in Switzerland, she withdrew the loan application to prevent further scrutiny. In February 2017, the $55,000 portion of the overdraft not spent by Fortress as part of the due diligence process was returned to Sorokin. Sorokin then spent lavishly on luxury clothes, electronics, and a personal trainer, as well as $800 hair highlighting and $400 eyelash extensions.

On February 18, 2017, Sorokin checked into a $400/night room at the 11 Howard hotel in Soho, Manhattan. She often gave a $100 cash gratuity to the concierge, whom she befriended, and other employees for simple tasks such as restaurant recommendations or bringing packages to her room. Still, most of the staff found Sorokin to be annoying and described her comments as impolite and classist. Sorokin became comfortable in the hotel and regularly walked around in leggings or a hotel robe, often dining at Le Coucou, the hotel restaurant, where Sorokin befriended chef Daniel Rose and billed the cost of her meals to her room. She treated the concierge to massages, manicures, and sessions with the celebrity personal trainer Kacy Duke.

After management discovered that there was no credit card on file for Sorokin, they insisted that she settle her $30,000 bill. Sorokin had a case of 1975 Dom Pérignon champagne delivered to the staff in an attempt to keep them on her side; hotel policy prevented the staff from accepting the gift. By March 2017, one month after receiving the $55,000 remaining from her loan application fee, because of her lavish spending, Sorokin had run out of money. She then would offer to take friends out for drinks and dinner but when it was time to pay the bill, she would claim that she had forgotten her credit cards or her credit cards would not work. By this time, Sorokin was very active in the New York social scene; she attended dinner parties where she met Macaulay Culkin and Martin Shkreli.

In April 2017, Sorokin deposited $160,000 worth of fraudulent checks into a Citibank account, of which she was able to retrieve $70,000. She then wired $30,000 to 11 Howard to pay the outstanding bill.

In May 2017, by sending a forged wire transfer confirmation from Deutsche Bank for the $35,390 fee, Sorokin booked a return charter flight on a business jet via Blade to Omaha, Nebraska, to attend the annual meeting of Berkshire Hathaway with the goal of meeting Warren Buffett. Sorokin had allegedly met Blade CEO Robert S. Wiesenthal although Wiesenthal later said that he did not know her at all. Blade reported her to the police in August 2017 after repeated failure to pay. Sorokin later claimed that during the trip she snuck into a private party at the Henry Doorly Zoo and Aquarium where she mingled with Bill Gates.

Since Sorokin still refused to provide a credit card to the 11 Howard hotel, while she was in Omaha, the entry code to her hotel room was changed, and her belongings were placed in storage. As retribution, using a tactic she learned from Martin Shkreli, she purchased the domain names corresponding to the names of the hotel managers and emailed them asking for a ransom of $1 million each. After three months of living at 11 Howard, with the help of her friend Rachel DeLoache Williams, Sorokin moved her belongings to The Mercer Hotel. Sorokin also stayed two nights at The Bowery Hotel, sending the hotel a fake wire transfer receipt from Deutsche Bank.

In May 2017, Sorokin invited Williams, Kacy Duke, and her videographer on what she said was an "all-expenses-paid" journey to Morocco, supposedly because she needed to "reset" her Electronic System for Travel Authorization (ESTA). Inspired by Khloé Kardashian, Sorokin booked a $7,000/night riad with three bedrooms, a private swimming pool, and a dedicated butler at La Mamounia, a 5-star luxury hotel in Marrakesh, with plans to make "a behind-the-scenes documentary" on the creation of her foundation.

After a few days, staff said that they were unable to charge Sorokin's credit cards and demanded an alternative form of payment. Sorokin gave excuses, blaming people for typing in the numbers wrong, or their systems for being down. The lack of a credit card on file led to a hotel staff member being fired. Sorokin convinced Williams to pay the $62,000 bill, which was more than a year of net salary for Williams, using her work and personal credit cards, with a promise to reimburse her via wire transfer. Williams had also paid for the flights to Morocco, items purchased by Sorokin, and a private tour of Majorelle Garden using her credit cards, with promises by Sorokin to be reimbursed.

Despite repeated promises from Sorokin, and one excuse after another, Williams was only repaid $5,000 and needed to borrow money from friends to pay her rent as she only had $410 in her checking account at the time. American Express later removed approximately $52,000 of the charges on her credit cards. After contacting other acquaintances who also lent money to Sorokin and were not repaid, and who all had heard different backstories on Sorokin's parents' alleged wealth, Williams realized that Sorokin was committing fraud.

In Morocco, Sorokin also stayed at Kasbah Tamadot, a Virgin Limited Edition luxury hotel, and at the Four Seasons Hotels and Resorts in Casablanca, where she asked Duke, who had already returned to New York due to a foodborne illness, to pay for the room. When Duke also offered to pay for a flight back to New York for Sorokin, she asked for first class travel. Sorokin drank fine wines and the most expensive champagnes and took a helicopter to the airport in Casablanca.

Returning to New York later in May, Sorokin relocated to the Beekman Hotel. Twenty days later, in June 2017, having accumulated a bill of $11,518 and failing to pay despite repeated promises, she was evicted. She then attempted a similar scam at the W New York Downtown Hotel and Residences, failing to pay her $503.76 bill; she was evicted after two days and charged with theft of services. By July 5, Sorokin was homeless. She then interrupted Duke in the middle of a date, crying and pressuring her into providing lodging. She also asked Williams for lodging, again in a crying tantrum; Williams refused. Sorokin also tried to dine and dash at the restaurant at the Le Parker Meridien hotel. When caught, she claimed to police that she could get a friend to pay the bill in five minutes. At this time, Sorokin was being investigated by the Manhattan District Attorney for bank fraud.

On August 17 and 21, 2017, Sorokin allegedly deposited two bad checks worth $15,000 into her account at Signature Bank and over the next few days, she withdrew approximately $8,200 in cash before the checks were returned.

Indictment and arrest
Sorokin was arrested on October 3, 2017, in a sting operation planned by Michael McCaffrey, a police officer with the New York Police Department working with the Manhattan District Attorney's office. In order to facilitate the "sting", McCaffrey worked closely with Sorokin's former friend, Rachel Williams. At the time, Sorokin was staying at Passages Malibu, a luxury rehab/addiction treatment facility in California.

In order to convince Sorokin to enter a more public venue where an arrest would be more easily effected, McCaffrey had Williams arrange a lunch meeting at a restaurant outside of the facility. When Sorokin left the facility, she was arrested by officers from the Los Angeles Police Department. Later that month, Sorokin was indicted by a grand jury convened by Manhattan District Attorney Cyrus Vance Jr. on two counts of attempted grand larceny in the first degree, three counts of grand larceny in the second degree, one count of grand larceny in the third degree, and one count of misdemeanor theft of services for the fraudulent loan applications made to City National and Fortress, the check fraud, the cost of the trip to Morocco, and the unpaid hotel and restaurant bills.

Trial, conviction, and sentence
On December 18, 2018, Sorokin appeared in New York City Criminal Court and rejected a plea deal that offered three to nine years in prison. A trial started on March 20, 2019, presided over by Judge Diane Kiesel.

At her request, Sorokin's defense attorney arranged for a wardrobe stylist to source outfits for her court appearances. On Wednesday, she swapped out her Rikers Island uniform for a Michael Kors shift dress. The following day, she paired a sheer black Saint Laurent top with Victoria Beckham trousers. On the Friday of the trial Sorokin refused to enter the courtroom because she did not want to appear in her prison-issued clothing, and her civilian outfit for the day "had not been pressed". After a crying tantrum and delaying the trial for an hour and a half, she was forced to appear by the judge.

At trial, Sorokin's lawyer defended her by saying that her intent all along was to repay the debt and that services were given to her in exchange for publicity on Instagram. He described her as an entrepreneur with a comparison to Frank Sinatra, claiming they both created a "golden opportunity" in New York.

On April 25, 2019, after deliberating for two days, the jury found Sorokin guilty of eight charges, including grand larceny in the second degree, attempted grand larceny, and theft of services. Sorokin was found not guilty of two other charges: one of attempted grand larceny in the first degree relating to the original loan application with City National, and one of larceny in the second degree relating to the alleged theft of $62,000 from Rachel Williams in Marrakesh.

In an interview before her sentencing, Sorokin said that "I'd be lying to you and to everyone else and to myself if I said I was sorry for anything". On May 9, 2019, Sorokin was sentenced to 4 to 12 years in state prison, fined $24,000, and ordered to pay restitution of $199,000, including $100,000 to City National, $70,000 to Citibank, and approximately two-thirds of the amount owed to Blade. These amounts, as well as approximately $75,000 in legal fees related to the trial, were paid from proceeds of Sorokin's $320,000 deal with Netflix; the court allowed Sorokin to keep the remaining $22,000. Sorokin was not forced to pay the $160,000 in legal fees owed to Perkins Coie related to the unsuccessful lease of Church Missions House, $65,000 in legal fees due to Gibson Dunn related to the unsuccessful $22 million loan application, and $30,000 in legal fees due to Lowenstein Sandler.

Sorokin was incarcerated at Rikers Island during the trial, where she had thirteen infractions for misbehavior such as fighting and disobeying orders, and was placed into solitary confinement during Christmas. After the trial, Sorokin, inmate #19G0366 of the New York State Department of Corrections, was initially housed at Bedford Hills Correctional Facility for Women before being transferred to Albion Correctional Facility. On February 11, 2021, Sorokin was released from prison on parole. After release, she checked in to The NoMad hotel and hired a German camera crew to follow her and film her activities.

Six weeks after her release on parole, on March 25, 2021, she was taken into custody by Immigration and Customs Enforcement (ICE) for overstaying her visa. She was held in a New Jersey county jail by ICE awaiting deportation to Germany, which she is legally contesting. An immigration judge ruled that if Sorokin were freed, she "would have the ability and inclination to continue to commit fraudulent and dishonest acts".

In January 2022, she tested positive for COVID-19 in prison and was placed in quarantine. While still in prison on March 1, 2022, Sorokin joined a class-action suit filed by the American Civil Liberties Union. Sorokin alleges ICE refused multiple requests for a COVID-19 booster shot. She received the one-dose Johnson & Johnson vaccine the previous April.

On October 5, 2022, Sorokin was granted a $10,000 bail bond and released from prison. As of October 2022, Sorokin is required to remain in a 24-hour home confinement with electronic monitoring and no access to social media.

Media representation
In 2018, after an article by Jessica Pressler on Sorokin was published in New York, Netflix paid Sorokin $320,000 for the rights to her life story. However, the New York Attorney General's office sued Sorokin in 2019 using the state's Son of Sam law, which prohibits those convicted of a crime from profiting from its publicity and forced the majority of these funds to be used to pay restitution and fines per the judgment.

In July 2019, My Friend Anna, a book written by Rachel DeLoache Williams, was published by Gallery Publishing Group, an imprint of Simon & Schuster, as well as by Quercus in the UK and Goldmann in Germany. Williams received $300,000 for the book, in which she details her experiences with Sorokin, including how the trip to Marrakesh affected her financially and mentally. Screenwriter Lena Dunham paid Williams $35,000 for an option to the television rights to her story but did not exercise it, so the story rights returned to Williams.

Sorokin's story has been the subject of an episode of American Greed by CNBC, an episode of Generation Hustle by HBO Max, an episode of 20/20, where Sorokin was interviewed by Deborah Roberts while in ICE custody, and an episode of 60 Minutes where Sorokin was interviewed by Liam Bartlett.

In December 2019, Sorokin's story was the subject of Fake Heiress, a drama-documentary podcast by journalist Vicky Baker and playwright Chloe Moss released by BBC Radio 4, starring Bella Dayne as Sorokin. In the 2020 American television series Katy Keene, the character of Pepper Smith, played by Julia Chan, is loosely based on Sorokin.

In late July and early August 2021, Anna X, a stage play inspired by Sorokin's story by Joseph Charlton starring Emma Corrin and Nabhaan Rizwan, ran at the Harold Pinter Theatre in London and The Lowry in Salford.

Netflix's nine-episode series Inventing Anna was created by Shonda Rhimes. In it, Sorokin is played by Julia Garner. The series was released in February 2022 and was the top watched program on Netflix during the week it was released.

In 2022, Sorokin signed a deal with Bunim/Murray Productions to star in a reality television series about her life after prison. She is also working on a book about her time in jail and a podcast. In late May 2022, Sorokin joined sisters Paris Hilton and Nicky Rothschild on an episode of Hilton's podcast This is Paris.

Art shows and sales

As of December 2022, Sorokin had sold $340,000 worth of art.  The proceeds were used to post bail and pay three months of rent for Sorokin's $4,250/month one-bedroom apartment in the East Village, Manhattan.

Sorokin gave an autographed, limited edition print of "Run It Again" portraying Sorokin instructing a sales clerk to try her credit/metro card again to Chloe Fineman, an actor who had portrayed Sorokin.

Shows

A pop-up group show called "Free Anna Delvey" ran at 176 Delancey Street on the Lower East Side from March 17 to March 24, 2022, while Sorokin was still incarcerated. The show incorporated art from 33 artists inspired by Sorokin, including Noah Becker, publisher of Whitehot magazine. Each piece was listed for sale for $10,000. It was co-curated by Alfredo Martinez, who had previously been to prison for forging Jean-Michel Basquiat paintings, and Julia Morrison, who fronted $8,000 of her own money to fund the show but was never repaid despite promises by Sorokin to do so. One of the pieces, titled Send Bitcoin, features a seated Sorokin wearing a red dress while working on a computer and facing away from the viewer. Other pieces included Anna on ICE, and ICE, both referring to U.S. Immigration and Customs Enforcement. UltraNYC called the pieces "doodles" and "part of her latest ploy to profit from her newfound fame..." Grunge stated the show "generally displayed [Sorokin] in a sympathetic, if not overtly positive, light."

On May 19, 2022, while Sorokin was still incarcerated, "Allegedly" opened in a nightclub on the second floor of the Public Hotel in Manhattan. The show opened with the song "Flashing Lights" by rapper Kanye West, followed by drag queen Yuhua Hamasaki hyping up the crowd. Models walked through the room holding Sorokin's drawings in gold-plated frames while wearing white gloves, Versace sunglasses, and black stockings covering their heads and faces. Sorokin addressed the crowd via a prerecorded recording, stating the show was "my narrative from my perspective". The drawings were again priced at  each, with Sorokin stating 15% of the proceeds will go to children's charities. The show was attended by many reporters and publicists.

Non-fungible tokens

In June 2022, Sorokin announced that she was launching a collection of non-fungible tokens. She created 10 such tokens that she claimed will give holders "exclusive access" to her.

Personal life
Sorokin maintains social media accounts, which she has described as satire, on Twitter and Instagram. Through Instagram, she connected with Julia Fox, with whom she is planning a collaboration. In January 2021, Sorokin penned a sarcastic letter to Donald Trump in which she anticipated his becoming a prisoner at Rikers Island. Sorokin had a boyfriend in New York for two years until he moved to the United Arab Emirates. Despite keeping his identity secret, Sorokin disclosed that her boyfriend gave TED talks and was profiled in The New Yorker. She suggested she would reveal his identity for a fee, with bidding starting at $10,000; however, Rachel DeLoache Williams revealed the boyfriend's identity to be Hunter Lee Soik. In 2019, Sorokin made investments in technology and cryptocurrency. At that time, her aspirations included running an investment fund.

See also
 List of con artists

References

External links
 

1991 births
21st-century German women artists
21st-century Russian women artists
21st-century Russian criminals
21st-century German criminals
German expatriates in the United States
German fraudsters
German socialites
Impostors
Living people
People convicted of fraud
People from Domodedovo (town)
Prisoners and detainees of New York (state)
Russian emigrants to Germany
Russian expatriates in the United States
Russian fraudsters
Russian socialites